Carnoviste (1825 ca. – 1876) was a southern (Guadalupe)  Mescalero chief, his band—presumably  Tsehitcihéndé or Niit'ahénde—lived in the Texan Big Bend Country, ranging on both sides of the Rio Grande from the  Guadalupe Mountains towards east of the Limpia Mountains (also known as Davis Mountains) onto the edge of the Southern Plains.

War leader and chief 
Trained as a warrior under Marco's leadership, he was reported to have committed frequent "depredations" on the San Antonio road; he became a war leader and a band chief probably during the early sixties and the Civil War, when Unionist and Confederate contenders showed a strategic interest for the northern part of the Apache territory (and the northern – Sierrablanca and Sacramento – Mescaleros had to face most of gen. John R. Baylor and gen. James H. Carleton efforts) but just a little, limited to the San Antonio – El Paso trail, for the southern part. 
After the Civil War,  U.S. troops were sent to take control over the southwestern territories, and the "Buffalo Soldiers" of the 9th Cavalry took possession again of Fort Stockton and Fort Davis, along the "Lower Road" from El Paso to San Antonio in the heart of southern Mescalero lands, rebuilding them and patrolling the Texan Big Bend region to stop the restless Mescalero (and mostly southern – Guadalupe and Limpia – Mescalero, among whom, after the Limpia Alsate, also Guadalupe Carnoviste's star was rising) raiding west of the Rio Grande and east of the Pecos. In December 1867 a southern Mescalero party, more than 100 warriors strong, attacked the El Paso – San Antonio coach south-east of El Paso, killing a soldier of the military escort and chasing the coach until Eagle Springs Station, where the Mescaleros were intercepted and repulsed by a troop of the 9tt Cavalry.
In May 1870, in the Fort Mason vicinity, Carnoviste and his war chief Chivat led a raid against Lehmann's farm and kidnapped Herman - soon adopted in the tribe as Carnoviste's stepson - and Willie Lehmann – soon lost to the pursuing Texas Rangers.

In 1874 Carnoviste, after seeing his band repeatedly assaulted and badly hit by their old Comanche enemies, promoted a council of Mescalero, Mimbreño and Lipan Apache chiefs; among the others, attended the council Alsate, with his "segundos" Zorrillo and Colorado (Avispa Colorada, chief of a Lipan band joint to the Limpia Mescalero chief), probably the Sacramento Mescalero chiefs Caballero  and San Juan, aging Mimbreño chief Nana (married among the Mescalero people) and the great Mimbreño chief Victorio: on which occasion Victorio succeeded in persuading the council to send peace messengers to the Comanches and Kiowas, who accepted the peace and friendship agreement; during the spring 1874, as many other southern Mescaleros, Carnoviste and his people went to Mexico, but, chased by regular Mexican soldiers and rurales, Carnoviste's band was forced to go back to Texas, where they were captured by the "Buffalo Soldiers" of the 10th Cavalry ; in the reservation, 20 Mescaleros of Carnoviste's band died because of a pestilence and the chief led back to Mexico his people; attacked and chased by Mexican troops, Carnoviste and his Mescaleros were forced to ford again the Rio Grande to Texas, but, just forded the river, they were attacked by U.S. Cavalry and lost over 60 people (warriors and non combatants) before managing to break away to a sanctuary somewhere in the Big Bend between the Rio Grande and the Pecos.

Sundown and death 
After some lucky raids in the 1875 spring and summer, still chased by the Texas Rangers, Carnoviste's band reached Fort Sill to surrender, but the chief didn't want to give up his stepson and tried to flee again, only to surrender again at Pinos Blancos (New Mexico) in the late 1875 with his last seventy Apache.

In the spring 1876 Carnoviste was killed by a medicine man of his band, his stepson Indot (Herman Lehmann) killed the murderer and had to leave the tribe, and the trusty war chief, Chivat, succeeded him in the chieftainship.

References

Lehmann, Hermann. "Nine Years with the Indians".

Further reading
 O. W. Williams. Alsate, the last of the Chisos Apaches. undated (early 20th century). 
 Dan L. Thrapp. The Conquest of Apacheria. Norman: University of Oklahoma Press, 1967. 
 Dan L. Thrapp. Victorio and the Mimbres Apaches. Norman: University of Oklahoma Press, 1974. 
 E. Ball. In the Days of Victorio: Recollections of a Warm Springs Apache. Tucson: University of Arizona Press, 1972. 
 D.E. Worcester. The Apaches: Eagles of the Southwest. Norman: University of Oklahoma Press, 1979. 
 C.L. Sonnichsen. The Mescalero Apaches. Norman: University of Oklahoma Press, 1972. 

Mescalero Apache people
19th-century indigenous people of the Americas